All Shall Be Well is the second studio album by English singer and songwriter Virginia Astley. Released in April 1992, it includes contributions by Kate St. John, who worked with Virginia Astley as part of the Ravishing Beauties, and Virginia's daughter Florence.

Track listing

References

1992 albums
Virginia Astley albums